Vasily Kuzmich Shebuyev (in Kronstadt – , in Saint Petersburg) was a Russian painter, State Councilor and Rector at the Imperial Academy of Arts.

Biography 
His father was of noble lineage and served as the ranking custodian of materiels at the Admiralty Board. His artistic abilities were noticed early and he began taking lessons at the Imperial Academy as soon as he was old enough. In 1794, he officially became a student there, studying under Ivan Akimov and Grigory Ugryumov. He won a silver after his first year, and a gold medal the year following. In 1797, he graduated with a first degree certificate. He immediately became an assistant teacher and, a year later, was entrusted with teaching drawing to younger students.

In 1803, he was sent on a fellowship to study in Rome, where he practiced copying the old masters and made anatomical drawings from observing dissections. Three years later, he was recalled to Saint Petersburg to participate in decorating the Kazan Cathedral. After that, his life became devoted to the Academy. He was named an Academician in 1807, rose through the ranks, and eventually became Rector of Painting and Sculpture in 1832. Ten years later his title became the "Honored Rector". In 1831, he used his anatomical drawing experience to create anatomy textbooks for art students. Among those who studied under him at the Academy, one may name Karl Briullov, Alexander Ivanov, Fyodor Bruni and Pyotr Basin.

In addition to his responsibilities there, he was appointed Director of the Imperial Tapestry Manufactory in 1831, having earlier been made a Court Painter in 1823, in which capacity he oversaw the creation of the church canopy at Tsarskoye Selo. He was also named Supervisor of Paintings for Saint Isaac's Cathedral in 1844.

Works

References

Further reading 
 Большая биографическая энциклопедия (Great Biographical Encyclopedia) @ Академик 
 Русская живопись (Russian Painters) Biography and portrait.

External links

1777 births
1855 deaths
People from Kronstadt
People from Petergofsky Uyezd
Russian nobility
Russian painters
Russian male painters
History painters
Members of the Imperial Academy of Arts